Shamsher Gazi (1712-1760), also known as the Tiger of Bhati, was a ruler of Roshnabad and Tripura, which covers parts of modern-day Bangladesh and India. Gazi's reign (1748-1760) has been cited as the "most interesting episode" in Medieval Tripura's history.

Early life
Gazi was born into a Bengali Muslim family of farmers in the village of Kungura, in 1712. His father was Peyar (other sources say Pir) Muhammad Khan and mother's name was Kaiyara Bibi. From an early age, he began to serve under and be brought up by Nasir Mahmud, a zamindar (landowner) of the Chakla of Raushanabad. Mahmud had become the ruler of Chakla Raushanabad by undertaking to give a monetary recompense to the erstwhile Nawab of Bengal.

Rule
The advent of the British East India Company with its "exploitation and oppression" alongside zamindari subjugation, made life of the peasants and farmers difficult and despondent. Shamsher Gazi's efficient rule freed them of this control. With the granting of rent exemption to the peasants, he managed to govern the economy in an appropriate manner, leading to the reduction of the prices of essential commodities. He was generous to both the Hindus and Muslims. He had ponds dug, naming them after himself, and built many schools in and outside his capital Jagannath Sonapur. 'Kaiyar Sagar' was one of the larger ponds in the area.

Krishna Manikya, brother of Indra Manikya II, twice tried recapturing Udaipur (old Rangamati), the old capital of Tripura, but was defeated by Gazi in 1748. Consolidating his hold on Pargana Dakshinsik and Pargana Meherkul, Shamsher now became the ruler of Tripura. According to Mesbahul Huq's book Purbo Desh, Gazi repelled assaults by the "plundering Moghs and Bargees". Facing opposition from the kingdom's citizens, Gazi placed Udai Manikya's elder brother Banamali Thakur on the throne under the name Lakshman Manikya, though actual power remained with him. This continued for three years, though Lakshman failed to gain the support of the population.

Krishna Manikya, who had fled to Agartala, sought help from Mir Qasim, the Nawab of Bengal. Heeding the outcry, Gazi was arrested by Qasim by subterfuge for his excesses and put to death by a cannon. Referred to as a "notorious plunderer" in the Tippera District, Noakhali and Chittagong areas, the Manikya dynasty regained their kingdom.

In books
Gazinama, also called the Shamsher Gazi Nama,  composed in the first part of the 19th century, was the story of Shamser Gazni written by Manohar Saikh.
Purbo Desh in Bengali, by Mesbahul Huq about the life and exploits of Shamsher Gazni.
The Ballad of Shamsher- Gazi published by Maulavi Lutfur Khabir of Tipperah.

Notes

References

1712 births
1760 deaths
Cumilla District
People from Feni District
18th-century Bengalis
Rulers of Noakhali